Huarmicocha (possibly from Quechua warmi woman, wife, qucha lake, "woman's lake") is a large lake in Peru located in the Huancavelica Region, Huancavelica Province, Acobambilla District.

See also
 List of lakes in Peru
 Millococha

References

INEI, Compendio Estadistica 2007, page 26

Lakes of Peru
Lakes of Huancavelica Region